Vittorio Emanuele was an Italian pre-dreadnought battleship, laid down in 1901, launched in 1904 and completed in 1908. Vittorio Emmanuele was armed with a main battery of two  guns and twelve  guns.

Vittorio Emmaneule saw action in the Italo-Turkish War as the flagship of the 1st Division. During the war, she participated in operations in Cyrenaica and the eastern Mediterranean Sea, including the seizure of the islands of Rhodes and the Dodecanese. She served during the First World War, but saw no combat during the war due to the hesitance of both the Italian and Austro-Hungarian navies to risk their capital ships in pitched battle. She remained in service as a training ship until 1923, when she was stricken from the naval register and broken up for scrap.

Design

The design for the Regina Elena class was prepared by the noted naval engineer, Vittorio Cuniberti, then the Chief Engineer of the Italian  (Royal Navy). The first two vessels— and Vittorio Emanuele—were ordered for the 1901 fiscal year, and the final pair— and —were authorized the following year.

Characteristics

She displaced  at full load. The ship had a slightly inverted bow and a long forecastle deck that extended past the main mast. Vittorio Emanuele had a crew of 742–764 officers and enlisted men.

Her propulsion system consisted of two vertical triple-expansion steam engines, each driving a screw propeller. Steam for the engines was provided by twenty-eight coal-fired Belleville boilers that were vented into three funnels.

As built, the ship was armed with a main battery of two  40-caliber guns placed in two single gun turrets, one forward and one aft. The ship was also equipped with a secondary battery of twelve  45-cal. guns in six twin turrets amidships. Close-range defense against torpedo boats was provided by a battery of sixteen  40-cal. guns in casemates and pivot mounts. Vittorio Emanuele was also equipped with two  torpedo tubes placed in the hull below the waterline.

Vittorio Emanuele was protected with Krupp steel manufactured in Terni.

Service history
Vittorio Emanuele was built by the  shipyard in Castellammare di Stabia; her keel was laid down on 18 September 1901. The ship was launched on 12 October 1904, and construction was completed on 1 August 1908. Vittorio Emanuele served in the active duty squadron through 1910, by which time her three sisters had been completed, bringing the total number of front-line battleships to six, which also included the two s. The active duty squadron was typically in service for seven months of the year for training; the rest of the year they were placed in reserve.

Italo-Turkish War

On 29 September 1911, Italy declared war on the Ottoman Empire in order to seize Libya. Vittorio Emanuele served as the flagship of Vice Admiral Augusto Aubry, the commander of the 1st Division throughout the conflict. On 30 September, Vittorio Emanuele, her sister Roma, and the armored cruiser  cruised in the Aegean Sea, searching for the Ottoman training squadron that had departed Beirut for Constantinople two days before, and did not know that war had been declared. The Italian flotilla failed to locate its prey, which managed to safely reach Constantinople.

On 18 October, Vittorio Emanuele and her three sisters, along with three cruisers and several destroyers and torpedo boats escorted a convoy that carried half of the 2nd Infantry Division to Benghazi. When the Ottomans refused to surrender the city before the amphibious assault, the Italian fleet opened fire on the Turkish defenders at 08:00, while landing parties from the ships and the Army infantry went ashore. The Italians quickly forced the Ottomans to withdraw into the city by evening. After a short siege, the Ottoman forces withdrew on 29 October, leaving the city to the Italians.

By December, Vittorio Emanuele and the other ships of the 1st Squadron were dispersed in the ports of Cyrenaica. While there, they supported the Italian Army as it occupied the city and surrounding area by contributing landing parties and providing fire support to the ground troops. In early 1912, most of the fleet had withdrawn to Italy for repairs and refit, leaving only a small force of cruisers and light craft to patrol the North African coast. On 4 March, Aubry died while aboard his flagship; Admiral Luigi Faravelli replaced him as the squadron commander.

On 13 April, the 1st Division left Taranto, bound for the island of Rhodes. Meanwhile, the 3rd Division escorted a convoy of troopships from Tobruk to the island. The Italian heavy ships demonstrated off the city of Rhodes while the transports landed the expeditionary force  to the south on 4 May; the soldiers quickly advanced on the city, supported by artillery fire from the Italian fleet. The Turks surrendered the city the following day. Between 8 and 20 May, Vittorio Emanuele was involved in the seizure of several islands in the Dodecanese between Crete, Rhodes, and Samos.

In June, Vittorio Emanuele and the rest of the 1st Division was stationed at Rhodes. Over the next two months, the ships cruised in the Aegean to prevent the Turks from attempting to launch their own amphibious operations to retake the islands Italy had seized in May. The 1st Division returned to Italy in late August for repairs and refitting, and were replaced by the battleships of the 2nd Squadron. The 1st Division left port on 14 October, but was recalled later that day, when the Ottomans had agreed to sign a peace treaty to end the war.

World War I
Italy declared neutrality after the outbreak of World War I in August 1914, but by July 1915, the Triple Entente had convinced the Italians to enter the war against the Central Powers. The Austro-Hungarian Navy, Italy's traditional naval rival, was the primary opponent in the conflict. The Italian Naval Chief of Staff, Admiral Paolo Thaon di Revel, believed that an active fleet policy was prohibited by the serious threat from submarines in the confined waters of the Adriatic Sea. Instead, Revel decided to implement blockade at the southern end of the Adriatic with the battle fleet, while smaller vessels, such as the MAS boats conducted raids on Austro-Hungarian ships and installations. Meanwhile, Revel's capital ships would be preserved to confront the Austro-Hungarian battle fleet in the event that it sought a decisive engagement. As a result, the ship was not particularly active during the war.

During the war, Vittorio Emanuele and her three sisters were assigned to the 2nd Division. They spent much of the war rotating between the bases at Taranto, Brindisi, and Valona, but did not see combat. On 14–15 May 1917, three light cruisers of the Austro-Hungarian Navy raided the Otranto Barrage; in the ensuring Battle of the Strait of Otranto, Vittorio Emanuele and her sisters raised steam to assist the Allied warships, but the Italian commander refused to permit them to join the battle for fear of risking their loss in the submarine-infested Adriatic.

After the end of the war, Vittorio Emanuele was used as a training ship for a short period. In the summer of 1922, she was in Constantinople when the American destroyer  accidentally collided with a cutter from Vittorio Emanuele, causing minor damage to the boat. Then-Lieutenant Joseph J. Clark, Bulmers executive officer, came aboard Vittorio Emanuele to apologize for the incident.

In early 1922, the world's major navies, including Italy, signed the Washington Naval Treaty. According to the terms of the treaty, Italy could keep Vittorio Emanuele and her three sisters, along with the newer dreadnought battleships. Due to the small size and age of the ships, particularly in comparison to the modern dreadnoughts, the Italians could have kept the ships in service indefinitely. They could not, however, be replaced by new battleships under the normal practice of the Treaty system, which provided for replacements after a ship was 20 years old. Vittorio Emanuele was stricken from the naval register on 1 April 1923 and subsequently broken up for scrap.

Footnotes

Notes

Citations

References

Further reading

External links

 Vittorio Emanuele (1904) Marina Militare website

Regina Elena-class battleships
World War I battleships of Italy
1904 ships
Ships built in Castellammare di Stabia
Victor Emmanuel II of Italy